Abyssivirga alkaniphila  is a Gram-positive, rod-shaped, strictly anaerobic, mesophilic, syntrophic, alkane-degrading and motile bacterium from the genus of Abyssivirga which has been isolated from biofilm from a black smoker chimney from the Loki's Castle vent field near Norway.

References 

Lachnospiraceae
Bacteria described in 2016